Sinhala is a Unicode block containing characters for the Sinhala and Pali languages of Sri Lanka, and is also used for writing Sanskrit in Sri Lanka. The Sinhala allocation is loosely based on the ISCII standard, except that Sinhala contains extra prenasalized consonant letters, leading to inconsistencies with other ISCII-Unicode script allocations.

Block

History
The following Unicode-related documents record the purpose and process of defining specific characters in the Sinhala block:

References 

Unicode blocks
Sinhala script